The 2022–23 Southern Combination Football League season is the 98th in the history of the competition, which lies at levels 9, 10 and 11 (steps 5 and 6, and county feeder) of the English football league system.

The provisional club allocations for steps 5 and 6 were announced by The Football Association on 12 May.

Premier Division 
The Premier Division comprised 20 clubs from the previous season, 17 of which competed in the previous season

Team changes 

To the Premier Division
Promoted from Division One
 Midhurst & Easebourne
 Roffey

Transferred from the Southern Counties East League
 Crowborough Athletic

From the Premier Division
Transferred to the Wessex League Premier Division
 Pagham

Promoted to the Isthmian League South East Division
Littlehampton Town

Relegated to Division One
East Preston

League table

Results table

Results by matchday

Top scorers 
Correct as of 7 March 2023

Stadia and locations

Division One 
Division One was reduced to 17 clubs from 18, 15 of which competed from the previous season

Team changes 

To Division One
Transferred from Southern Counties East League
 Chessington & Hook United

Relegated from the Premier Division
 East Preston

From Division One
Promoted to the Premier Division
Midhurst & Easebourne
Roffey

Relegated to Division Two
Storrington

League table

Results table

Results by matchday

Top scorers 
Correct as of 7 March 2023

Stadia and locations

Division Two 
Division Two remained at 14 teams.

Team changes 

To Division Two
Promoted from West Sussex Football League
 Capel

Relegated from Division One
 Storrington

From Division Two
Left the league
 Littlehampton United

Promotion from this division depended on ground grading as well as league position.

League table

Results table

Results by matchday

Top scorers 
As of 7 March 2023

Stadia and locations

Peter Bentley League Challenge Cup 
Source: 2022–23 Peter Bentley League Cup

First round

Second round

Third round

Quarter-final

Semi-final

References 

2022-23
9